Peter Trimble Rowe (November 20, 1856 – June 1, 1942) was a Canadian prelate who served for decades as the first bishop of the American Episcopal Diocese of Alaska.

Early life and education
Peter Rowe was born in Meadowvale, Toronto Township, Ontario. He attended local schools and went to Trinity College, Toronto. There he earned his bachelor's degree in 1878, his master's degree in 1880, and his doctorate of divinity in 1895.

Clergy
Rowe was ordained to the diaconate in 1878 and the priesthood in 1880, by Frederick Dawson Fauquier, bishop of the Diocese of Algoma.

In 1895, he was appointed Missionary Bishop of Alaska. He was consecrated on November 30, 1895, by William Croswell Doane, Ozi William Whittaker, and Thomas A. Starkey.

Rowe traveled across his vast diocese for decades, by dogsled, boat and other frontier means. He gained many admirers, among whom was his colleague Hudson Stuck, Archdeacon of the Yukon. Stuck praised Rowe's dedication in his three books published to combat exploitation of the native peoples among whom they served.

Rowe died in Victoria, British Columbia on June 1, 1942.

References
 Thomas Jenkins, The Man of Alaska: Peter Trimble Rowe (New York: Morehouse-Gorham Co., 1943).
 Mushing Bishop, Time magazine, December 4, 1939.
 Photographs of Rowe, Alaska's Digital Archives

1856 births
1942 deaths
Episcopal bishops of Alaska
Trinity College (Canada) alumni